Some medical devices are named after persons.

References

Devices